John Cantwell (21 November 1923 – 1989) was a Scottish footballer who played for Celtic, Dumbarton, Morton and Stenhousemuir.

References

1923 births
1989 deaths
Scottish footballers
Dumbarton F.C. players
Celtic F.C. players
Greenock Morton F.C. players
Stenhousemuir F.C. players
Scottish Football League players
Association football forwards